Our Lady of Warraq is believed, by some, to be a mass apparition of the Virgin Mary that occurred 
at the Coptic Orthodox Virgin Mary and Archangel Michael church, in Warraq al-Hadar,
Giza, Egypt, in the early hours (1:00 AM – 4:00 AM) of Friday 11 December 2009.

Apparition
The first person who saw the alleged apparition of Mary was reportedly an Egyptian Muslim neighbour, who was sitting at his coffee shop nearby, when he apparently saw a strong light coming from the Coptic Christian place of worship. He and others are said to have observed the light condense into a female form.

Mary supposedly appeared above the middle dome of the church. The reported apparition is then said to have moved between the domes and on to the top of the church gate between its two twin towers in front of the central church building. Many local residents reported seeing the alleged apparition of Mary.

A representative of the Coptic Orthodox Church of Alexandria has approved the apparitions.

Critical evaluation of the events

Mary allegedly appeared in luminous robes, in a pure white dress and a royal blue belt, with a crown on her head. Critics have pointed out that this colour pattern somewhat matched the colour pattern of the lights on top of and inside the tower behind the church's domes, i.e. a golden illuminated cross on top of the tower and blueish-white and yellowish-white electric light sources inside the tower.

Cell phones were used to call friends, take pictures and make videos of the phenomenon and send them to friends.

Critics have suggested that the overexposed and blurry quality of the pictures and footage being sent around on cell phones, facilitated the illusory perception of a figure, when in fact some people were looking at what were low-quality images of the illuminated church tower behind the domes.

Critics have suggested that the alleged apparition is actually the tower behind the church's domes with bright lights inside and on top of it, seen from different angles.

The claim that the "apparition" moved is not substantiated by any of the film footage, which never shows any actual movement, only three apparently different locations. One film shows an elongated light above the middle dome, which critics say is the back tower seen from an angle that aligns it with the aforementioned middle dome. Another film shows the same elongated light to the right of the middle dome of the church, which critics say is the same illuminated tower seen from an angle that puts it between the middle dome and the dome to its right. A third film shows the same elongated light apparently standing on top of the entrance gate, but this can be argued to be the same back tower observed from standing almost right in front of the entrance gate. The fact that the "apparition" appears smaller in this third film is consistent with this interpretation.

In response to the claim that the authorities turned off the electricity to the area to rule out a hoax or fraud, critics have said that one explanation is that other power sources, such as generators, could have been used to power a bright light in the tower of church.

However, investigations undertaken by the Egyptian government at the time showed that no such electrical equipment was found to cause such a phenomenon. The Egyptian government, which some have accused of turning a blind eye to the persecution of Christians in the Middle East, did not identify this phenomenon as being fabricated by the Coptic Church.

Press coverage 

This event was widely covered by Egyptian newspapers, Arabic TV channels and by the international press.
The news about the apparitions appeared in multiple newspapers, including the Egyptian Watani,
American Los Angeles Times,
Egyptian Al-Ahram,
Italian AsiaNews,
Egyptian Almasry Alyoum,
and Egyptian Bikya Masr.

A December 24, 2009 Agence France Presse (AFP) article recounted nightly gatherings bringing crowds of up to 10,000 people to watch the tower in anticipation of the "mysterious light over the church tower," which upon its appearance each night "jolt[ed] the gathering into a frenzy of cries an ululations." This article was duplicated by several news agencies, including the Assyrian International News Agency,
Sudan Vision Daily,
Daily Star (Lebanon),
and British Middle East Online.

See also
 Our Lady of Zeitoun
 Our Lady of Assiut
 Marian apparition
 Coptic Orthodox Church

References

External links 
 
 
 
 
 

Marian apparitions
Coptic Orthodox Church
2009 in Egypt